Juninho, Portuguese for "little Junior", is a common nickname in Brazil for those whose full name includes Júnior. It is often combined with an epithet, sometimes a demonym (a word derived from their place of origin).  The following football players are known by some derivation of the name:

Juninho Fonseca (born 1958), full name Alcides Fonseca Júnior, Brazil international centre-back
Juninho Paulista (born 1973), full name Osvaldo Giroldo Júnior, Brazil international attacking midfielder
Juninho da Silva (born 1974), full name Edivaldo Sarafim da Silva Júnior, Brazilian football midfielder
Juninho Petrolina (born 1974), full name Hamilton Timbira Dias dos Santos Júnior, Brazilian attacking midfielder
Juninho Pernambucano (born 1975), full name Antônio Augusto Ribeiro Reis Júnior, Brazil international attacking midfielder
Juninho (footballer, born 1977) , full name Carlos Alberto Carvalho dos Anjos Junior, Brazilian football striker
Juninho Cearense (born 1980), full name Regilson Saboya Monteiro Júnior, Brazilian football midfielder
Juninho (footballer, born April 1981), full name Renato Agostinho de Oliveira Júnior, Brazilian football centre-back
Juninho (footballer, born May 1981), full name Fidelis Júnior Santana da Silva, Brazilian football midfielder
Juninho (footballer, born July 1981), full name Tadeu Jesus Nogueira Júnior, Brazilian football goalkeeper
Juninho (footballer, born July 1982), full name Osvaldo José Martins Júnior, Brazilian football midfielder
Juninho (footballer, born September 1982), full name Anselmo Vendrechovski Júnior, Brazilian football centre-back
Juninho (footballer, born 1983), full name Junio César Arcanjo, Brazilian football attacking midfielder
Juninho Tardelli (born 1983), full name José Tadeu Martins Júnior, Brazilian football midfielder
Juninho (footballer, born 1984), full name Wilson Aparecido Xavier Júnior, Brazilian football midfielder
Juninho (footballer, born 5 April 1985), full name Júnior César Moreira da Cunha, Brazilian football forward
Juninho (footballer, born 21 April 1985), full name Gilson Luís Pinheiro Júnior, Brazilian football midfielder
Juninho (footballer, born July 1985), full name Jose Carlos Nogueira Junior, Brazilian football forward
Juninho Quixadá (born 1985), full name Pedro Julião Azevedo Junior, Brazilian football forward
Juninho (footballer, born 1986), full name Paulo Roberto Valoura Júnior, Brazilian football midfielder
Juninho (footballer, born March 1987), full name José Artur de Melo Júnior, Brazilian football forward
Juninho (footballer, born November 1987), full name Adilson dos Anjos Oliveira, Brazilian football defensive midfielder
Juninho Botelho (born 1987), full name José Francisco da Silva Botelho Júnior, Brazilian football midfielder
Juninho (footballer, born January 1989), full name Vitor Gomes Pereira Junior, Brazilian football midfielder
Juninho (footballer, born June 1989), full name Roberto Neves Adam Júnior, Brazilian football midfielder
Juninho (footballer, born May 1989), full name Júnior Aparecido Guimaro de Souza, Brazilian football winger
Juninho (footballer, born January 1990), full name Evanildo Borges Barbosa Júnior, Brazilian football left-back
Juninho (footballer, born December 1990), full name Walter Soares Belitardo Júnior, Brazilian football attacking midfielder
Juninho Potiguar (born 1990), full name Jarlesson Inácio Júnior, Brazilian football forward
Juninho (footballer, born 1992), full name Denilton Venturim Júnior, Brazilian football defensive midfielder
Juninho Cabral (born 1992), full name Jacinto Júnior Conceição Cabral, Brazilian football striker
Juninho (footballer, born 1994), full name Junior Silva Ferreira, Brazilian football midfielder
Juninho (footballer, born February 1995), full name José Carlos Ferreira Júnior, Brazilian football centre-back
Juninho (footballer, born September 1995), full name Eduardo José Barbosa da Silva Júnior, Brazilian football midfielder
Juninho (footballer, born December 1995), full name Leovigildo Júnior Reis Rodrigues, Brazilian football centre-back
Juninho (footballer, born 1996), full name Olávio Vieira dos Santos Júnior, Brazilian football forward
Juninho Barros (born 1996), full name André Alexandre de Barros Junior, Brazilian football midfielder
Juninho Bacuna (born 1997), Curaçao football midfielder
Juninho Rocha (born 1997), full name Paulo Afonso da Rocha Junior, Brazilian football forward
Juninho Capixaba (born 1997), full name Luis Antônio da Rocha Júnior, Brazilian football left-back
Juninho (footballer, born 1999), full name Edimar Ribeiro da Costa Junior, Brazilian football forward
Kleber Juninho (born 1999), full name Kleber Alves da Costa Junior, Brazilian football winger
Juninho (footballer, born 2000), full name Antonio Valmor Assis Da Silva Junior, Brazilian football forward
Juninho (footballer, born 2003), full name Luiz Fernando Silvestre Junior, Brazilian football midfielder

See also
Junior – also a common nickname for Brazilian footballers
Vitor Júnior (born 1986), full name Vítor Silva Assis de Oliveira Jr., Brazilian football attacking midfielder sometimes known as Juninho